Secret Garden (秘密花园) is a Singaporean drama which aired on Mediacorp Channel U (Singapore). It debuted on 29 December 2010 and consists of 13 episodes.

Cast
Tender Huang
Yvonne Lim
Paige Chua
Li Wen Hai
Benjamin Heng
Chen Guohua
Henry Heng
Qin Wei
Julie Tan
Sugie Phua
Rebecca Lim
Lin Ru Ping
Cavin Soh
Yi Ling
Wu Kai Shen

Synopsis
From Mediacorp: Cao Qi Ming (Tender Huang), aka Dr Beng, is an unconventional psychiatrist who specializes in treating children and young people. Although he appears to be lazy and uncouth, he is really a perceptive and sensitive doctor at heart.

Dr Beng is a squatter at his ex-schoolmate, Swan’s (Yvonne Lim) clinic. Swan is a no-nonsense art therapist, she comes across as aloof and cold but is patient, professional and devoted to her patients.

Tracy (Paige Chua) is a rookie social worker. She is acquainted with Dr Beng when she brought her first case, a schizophrenic youth, to him. Initially disagreeable of his method, she changes her mind when she sees his effective way of treating the patients.

Dr Beng has been searching relentlessly for the culprit of an accident that killed his twin brother 18 years ago. Swan accidentally discovers the truth but holds back from Dr Beng, she even prevents him from finding out the truth. What is the secret behind the accident? Dr Beng is caught between Swan and Tracy, who is the one he truly loves?

External links
Secret Garden on MediaCorp

References

Singapore Chinese dramas
2010 Singaporean television series debuts
2011 Singaporean television series endings
Channel U (Singapore) original programming